The 1996 NCAA basketball tournament was the 72nd season in the Philippine National Collegiate Athletic Association (NCAA). The season opens on July 21 at the Araneta Coliseum and ended on October 9 with the San Sebastian Stags winning their fourth straight championship in the Seniors division.

League membership was raised from six to seven with the entry of Philippine Christian University.

Teams

Seniors' tournament

Elimination round
Format:
Tournament divided into two halves: winners of the two halves dispute the championship in a best-of-3 finals series unless:
A team wins both rounds. In that case, the winning team automatically wins the championship.
A third team has a better cumulative record than both finalists. In that case, the third team has to win in a playoff against the team that won the second round to face the team that won in the first round in a best-of-3 finals series.

First round team standings

Second round team standings

Cumulative standings
No other team had a better cumulative record than the two pennant winners, so playoff for the Finals berth was not played.

San Sebastian clinched the first round pennant with a six-game sweep, defeating the San Beda Red Lions, 100-91 on August 23. 

On September 26, San Beda finally halt San Sebastian's 10-game winning streak following an 81-80 victory. Both teams carry a 4-0 won-loss card in the second round of action.  

San Beda seals a finals date with San Sebastian Stags by capturing the second round flag, winning over Perpetual Help College, 90-83 on October 1, for a six-game sweep in the second round.

Finals

Game 1

Stags' Brixter Encarnacion poured all of his 19 points in the second half when the Lions tried to erase a 34-45 halftime deficit to come closer at 55-60, with 12:02 left.

Game 2

Ulysses Tanique put the final nail on the Red Lions' coffin as he stole a pass off Kerwin McCoy for a 79-75 advantage with 24.3 seconds remaining.

References

72
1996 in Philippine basketball